Salix apennina, the Apennine willow, is a species of flowering plant in the family Salicaceae, native to Italy. It is a pioneer species, among the very first to colonize recently denuded stream beds.

References

apennina
Endemic flora of Italy
Plants described in 1965